Peppino Mangravite (June 28, 1896 – April 26, 1978) was an Italian-American Modernist painter.

Peppino Gino Mangravite was born in 1896, on Lipari, an island north of Sicily, where his father, a naval officer, was stationed. As a child he began a traditional Italian art education in Carrara. In 1914, at the age of eighteen, Peppino Gino Mangravite settled in New York City with his father. He had already completed six years of study at the Scuole Techiniche Belle Arti in his native Italy, where coursework included the study of anatomy and Renaissance fresco techniques. Upon arrival in New York, he enrolled at Cooper Union, and by 1917 was studying under Robert Henri at the Art Students League.

He received Guggenheim Fellowships in 1932 and 1935.

In 1962 he exhibited his work at a two man show with Kenneth Evatt at Lehigh University at the invitation of Professor Francis Quirk. 

Mangravite was involved in New Deal art programs. He painted murals for the Department of Labor in Washington, D.C., and for post offices in Hempstead, New York and Atlantic City, New Jersey. In the 1950s he executed a mosaic mural for the main altar at the Shrine of St. Anthony in Boston, Massachusetts.

He was the Director of the Art Department at Sarah Lawrence College and a Professor of Painting at Columbia University.

Collections 

 Corcoran Gallery of Art 
 Metropolitan Museum of Art 
 Whitney Museum of American Art 
 Phillips Memorial Gallery  
 Art Institute of Chicago 
 Pennsylvania Academy of Fine Arts 
 Toledo Museum of Art 
 Denver Art Museum 
 California Palace of the Legion of Honor 
 Cincinnati Art Museum 
 Encyclopedia Britannica Collection
 U.S. State Department-  Art in Embassies

External links 

 Guggenheim Fellows

References

1896 births
1978 deaths
20th-century American painters
Columbia University faculty
Sarah Lawrence College faculty
Italian emigrants to the United States